Egmond-Binnen is a village in the Dutch province of North Holland.

History 
The village was first mentioned in 922 as Ekmunde. The etymology is unknown. The missionary Adalbert of Egmond founded a chapel near Egmond-Binnen and died there around 740. In 922, the Benedictine Egmond Abbey was founded at the location and a settlement developed around it. The abbey was plundered and partially destroyed in 1573. The loot was used to finance the founding of Leiden University. In 1789, the south tower collapsed, and the remainder was sold for demolition.

The Dutch Reformed church was built in 1836 at the former north tower of the abbey. Between 1914 and 1956, the church was built and a tower was added. In 1933, a new monastery was built in Egmond-Binnen and elevated to abbey in 1950.

Egmond-Binnen was home to 915 people in 1840. It was a separate municipality until 1978, when it merged with Egmond aan Zee and Egmond aan den Hoef to form the new municipality Egmond. In turn, Egmond was amalgamated into Bergen on 1 January 2001.

Gallery

References

Former municipalities of North Holland
Populated places in North Holland
Bergen, North Holland